Limonium carolinianum, known variously as Carolina sealavender, canker root, ink root, marsh root, lavender thrift, American thrift, or seaside thrift, is a species of flowering plant native to the eastern shores of North America, from northern Mexico to Canada. It is a slow-growing perennial herb found in salt marshes and other maritime habitats. Its inflorescences are frequently harvested for use in cut flower arrangements.

References

carolinianum
Plants described in 1894